Admiral Sir James Edward Clifford Goodrich  (28 June 1851 – 1 September 1925) was the last Commander-in-Chief, Pacific Station.

Naval career
Goorich was appointed a lieutenant in the Royal Navy in 1872, and promoted to Captain in 1895. On 7 June 1902 he was appointed in command of the new battleship HMS London, which was commissioned for service in the Mediterranean Fleet, and left Portsmouth in early July for Gibraltar. Briefly returning to home waters in August, London served as flagship for the Coronation Review for King Edward VII at Spithead on 16 August 1902, before she was back with the Mediterranean Fleet. He then served as Commander-in-Chief, Pacific Station from his appointment in 1903 to its closure in 1905. Improved communications, the signing of the Anglo-Japanese Alliance and the need to concentrate warships in British waters to counter the developing German High Seas Fleet, meant that the station was closed down at sunset on 1 March 1905. After being promoted to rear admiral in October 1905, he was appointed admiral superintendent of the Gibraltar Dockyard in 1906. His final promotion was to Admiral in 1913 on his retirement, although he was recalled to serve as a captain in the Royal Naval Reserve during World War I.

He died in 1925 and a memorial to him stands in St Cyr's Churchyard in Stinchcombe in Gloucestershire.

Family
He married Adeline Rose Helbert who helped with the founding of West Downs School.

References

1851 births
1925 deaths
Royal Navy admirals
Knights Commander of the Royal Victorian Order
Royal Naval Reserve personnel